United Nations Security Council resolution 1317, adopted unanimously on 5 September 2000, after recalling resolutions 1270 (1999), 1289 (1999) and 1313 (2000) on the situation in Sierra Leone, the Council extended the mandate of the United Nations Mission in Sierra Leone (UNAMSIL) until 20 September 2000.

UNAMSIL's mandate was revised and increased twice at the time of the adoption of Resolution 1317. The Secretary-General Kofi Annan, in his sixth report on Sierra Leone, recommended a six-month extension to UNAMSIL's mandate and an increase in its military component to 20,500 and 260 military observers.

See also
 List of United Nations Security Council Resolutions 1301 to 1400 (2000–2002)
 Sierra Leone Civil War
 Special Court for Sierra Leone

References

External links
 
Text of the Resolution at undocs.org

 1317
2000 in Sierra Leone
 1317
Sierra Leone Civil War
September 2000 events